Generalized relative entropy (-relative entropy) is a measure of dissimilarity between two quantum states. It is a "one-shot" analogue of quantum relative entropy and shares many properties of the latter quantity.

In the study of quantum information theory, we typically assume that information processing tasks are repeated multiple times, independently. The corresponding information-theoretic notions are therefore defined in the asymptotic limit. The quintessential entropy measure, von Neumann entropy, is one such notion. In contrast, the study of one-shot quantum information theory is concerned with information processing when a task is conducted only once. New entropic measures emerge in this scenario, as traditional notions cease to give a precise characterization of resource requirements. -relative entropy is one such particularly interesting measure.

In the asymptotic scenario, relative entropy acts as a parent quantity for other measures besides being an important measure itself. Similarly, -relative entropy functions as a parent quantity for other measures in the one-shot scenario.

Definition 

To motivate the definition of the -relative entropy , consider the information processing task of hypothesis testing.

From the definition, it is clear that . This inequality is saturated if and only if , as shown below.

Relationship to the trace distance 
 

For  , it holds that
a) 

In particular, this implies the following analogue of the Pinsker inequality

b) 

Furthermore, the proposition implies that for any ,  if and only if , inheriting this property from the trace distance. This result and its proof can be found in Dupuis et al.

Proof of inequality a)

Upper bound: Trace distance can be written as

 

For any POVM element  we have

so that if , we have

From the definition of the -relative entropy, we get
 

 
where 

This means
 
and thus 

Moreover,

Hence

Proof of inequality b)

To derive this Pinsker-like inequality, observe that

Alternative proof of the Data Processing inequality 
A fundamental property of von Neumann entropy is strong subadditivity.  Let  denote the von Neumann entropy of the quantum state , and let  be a quantum state on the tensor product Hilbert space . Strong subadditivity states that

where  refer to the reduced density matrices on the spaces indicated by the subscripts.
When re-written in terms of mutual information, this inequality has an intuitive interpretation; it states that the information content in a system cannot increase by the action of a local quantum operation on that system. In this form, it is better known as the data processing inequality, and is equivalent to the monotonicity of relative entropy under quantum operations:

for every CPTP map , where  denotes the relative entropy of the quantum states .

It is readily seen that -relative entropy also obeys monotonicity under quantum operations:
,
for any CPTP map .
Since the adjoint of any CPTP map is also positive and unital,  this is a valid POVM. Note that , where  is the POVM that achieves .
Not only is this interesting in itself, but it also gives us the following alternative method to prove the data processing inequality.

By the quantum analogue of the Stein lemma,

where the minimum is taken over  such that 

See also
Entropic value at risk
Quantum relative entropy
Strong subadditivity
Classical information theory
Min-entropy

References

Quantum mechanical entropy